Seymours Court Farmhouse in Beckington, Somerset, England, dates from the 15th century and is a Grade I listed building.

It was the home of Thomas Seymour, 1st Baron Seymour of Sudeley, who married Queen Catherine Parr.

See also
 List of Grade I listed buildings in Mendip

References

Houses completed in the 15th century
Grade I listed buildings in Mendip District
Grade I listed houses in Somerset
Farmhouses in England